Waropen is an Austronesian language spoken at the Geelvink Bay of Indonesian Papua. It is fairly closely related to the Yapen languages.
Dialects are Waropen Kai, Napan, and Ambumi.

Phonology 

Sounds  can be heard as vowels  when after vowel sounds.

Distribution
In Papua province, it is spoken in Mamberamo Raya Regency and Waropen Regency. The Ambumi dialect is spoken in the south Waropen Bay area. Waropen is also spoken southwest to the Rombak River mouth.

References

South Halmahera–West New Guinea languages
Languages of western New Guinea